Kamouh el Hermel, the Pyramid of Hermel (also known as God's Pyramid, House of El, the Funnel of Hermel or Needle of Hermel) is an ancient pyramid located  south of Hermel in Baalbek-Hermel Governorate, Lebanon.

Location, description
The pyramid sits on top of a hill that is clearly visible from a distance and has been fenced off to prevent damage. Despite this, the monument was heavily vandalised by locals in 2000–2018, all the four faces of the base being covered with graffiti and no serious measures being taken by the authorities for its conservation. Some sections of the monument were restored in 1931. A relief on the north side depicts two deer, possibly caught in a hunting trap. On the east side is a carved image of a boar being attacked by dogs and speared. The south side is badly damaged but shows an image considered possibly to be a bear. The relief on the west side shows two wolves attacking a bull.

Shepherd Neolithic archaeological site

Evidence was found of a Shepherd Neolithic archaeological site in the area around the monument, on the south and west of the hill. The site was discovered and a collection of flint tools used during the Neolithic Revolution was made by Lorraine Copeland and Frank Skeels in 1965. Materials recovered included blade-butts with scraping edges or notches, borers, cores (one with a twin edge) and small flakes. Some pieces were vaguely bifacial. The flints found were in a grey or chocolate-brown colour with some having a shiny patina.

Modern identification

The pyramid has been suggested to date to the first or second century BC due to similarities with architecture of tower tombs of the late Seleucid era at Palmyra in Syria. It was considered by William McClure Thomson to possibly have been of Ancient Greek construction; however, the lack of inscriptions puzzled him as he thought the ancient Greeks to be a "scribbling generation". Thomson also entertained the notion, along with Charles William Meredith van de Velde that the construction may have been Assyrian. René Dussaud later suggested that although the reliefs resembled the Ishtar Gate, the edifice was likely a monument to the hunting prowess of a member of Syrian royalty from the first century BC.

Gallery

References

External links
 Hermel Pyramid on Wikimapia.org
 Kamouh Hermel video on YouTube
 al-hermel.org (in Arabic)
 Hermel Pyramid on discoverlebanon.com
 Qâmoûaa el Hermel on travelingluck.com
 Qâmoûaa el Hermel on geographic.org
 Images of Qâmou el Hermel on Lebanoneguide.com

Buildings and structures completed in the 1st century BC
Hermel District
Great Rift Valley
Archaeological sites in Lebanon
Populated places in Lebanon
Beqaa Valley
Shepherd Neolithic sites
Pyramids in Asia
Ancient Greek archaeological sites in Western Asia
Tourist attractions in Lebanon
Hellenistic sites